Kendriya Vidyalaya, Ballia is a Kendriya Vidyalaya school located  from Ballia Railway Station in Uttar Pradesh. It has a permanent building of about 4.55 acres.

External links
Official website of Kendriya Vidyalaya, Ballia

Kendriya Vidyalayas in Uttar Pradesh
Ballia
Educational institutions established in 1983
1983 establishments in Uttar Pradesh